Russia competed at the 2011 World Aquatics Championships in Shanghai, China between July 16 and 31, 2011.

Medalists

Diving

Russia has qualified 11 athletes in diving.

Men

Women

Open water swimming

Men

Women

Mixed

Swimming

Russia qualified 32 swimmers.

Men

 * raced in heats only

Women

 * qualified due to withdrawal of another swimmer

Synchronised swimming

Russia has qualified 12 athletes in synchronised swimming.

Women

Reserves
Anisya Olkhova
Alexandra Zueva

Water polo

Women

Team Roster

Maria Kovtunovskaya
Nadezhda Fedotova
Ekaterina Prokofyeva
Sofia Konukh – Captain
Alexandra Antonova
Natalia Ryzhova-Alenicheva
Ekaterina Lisunova
Evgenia Soboleva
Ekaterina Tankeeva
Olga Belyaeva
Evgenia Ivanova
Yulia Gaufler
Anna Karnaukh

Group C

Playoff round

Quarterfinals

Semifinals

Bronze medal game

References

Nations at the 2011 World Aquatics Championships
2011 in Russian sport
Russia at the World Aquatics Championships